Padoue is a municipality in Quebec, Canada.

Demographics 
In the 2021 Census, Statistics Canada reported that Padoue had a population of 250 living in 111 of its 123 total dwellings, a 2% change from its 2016 population of 245.

See also
 List of municipalities in Quebec

References

External links

Municipalities in Quebec
Incorporated places in Bas-Saint-Laurent